Shrutlekhan-Rajbhasha is a Hindi language speech recognition software application developed by C-DAC in collaboration with IBM . It takes Hindi sound as input and converts to Devanagari text as output.

One drawback of this software is that if mixed English–Hindi dictation is given, it can recognize Hindi words but can not recognize English words. Another variant of this software is Vachantar-Rajbhasha, which takes English sound as input, converts it to English text and then translates it to Hindi using MANTRA-Rajbhasha translation engine.

References

External links
C-DAC website
Software developed to transcribe Hindi speech into text form
C-DAC/IBM Unveil Shrutlekhan-Rajbhasha Hindi Speech Recognition Tool
Tech hurdle for Hindi as official language: Secy
हिन्दी श्रुतलेखन सॉफ्टवेयर उन्मोचित

Speech recognition software
Indic computing